Chidinma Nkeruka Okeke (born 11 August 2000) is a Nigerian professional footballer who plays for Madrid CFF. She was formerly at FC Robo in the Nigeria Women Premier League, and has also played for the Nigeria women's national football team. She was part of the Nigerian team that won the 2019 WAFU Women's Cup in Ivory Coast.

Career 
In 2016, Okeke represented Nigeria women's national U-17 football team at the 2016 FIFA U-17 Women's World Cup.

In 2017, she lost to Rasheedat Ajibade in the women's division finals of Nigeria Freestyle Football competition.

In July 2018, she was named by Coach Christopher Danjuma in the final squad-list of Nigeria women's national under-20 football team for the 2018 FIFA U-20 Women's World Cup.

At the 2019 WAFU Women's Cup, Okeke was on the scoresheet as Nigerian team defeated Niger to qualify for the semi-finals.

She was also included in the Nigerian squad for 2019 FIFA Women's World Cup.

In August 2019, Okeke signed for Madrid CFF in Spanish Primera División, and made her first team debut in a win against Real Betis on 8 September 2019.

References 

2000 births
Living people
Nigerian women's footballers
Nigeria women's international footballers
2019 FIFA Women's World Cup players
Primera División (women) players
Madrid CFF players
Nigerian expatriate women's footballers
Nigerian expatriate sportspeople in Spain
Expatriate women's footballers in Spain
Women's association football defenders
FC Robo players
Sportspeople from Warri